Sotiris Petroulas (Greek: Σωτήρης Πέτρουλας), 1943 - 21 July 1965, was a Greek student that was killed on 21 July 1965 during demonstrations against the governments of "Apostasia".

Born in Oitylo, he was a founding member of the "Lambrakis Youth", named after Grigoris Lambrakis, who was murdered in 1963.

During one of the demonstrations of July 1965 in Athens, he was either hit by men of the Cities Police, or he was arrested and murdered. His funeral became another opportunity for new demonstrations, while Georgios Papandreou gave a speech.

A song was composed in his honour by Mikis Theodorakis.

References

1943 births
1965 deaths
People murdered in Greece
Members of the Lambrakis Democratic Youth
People from East Mani
Greek activists
Apostasia of 1965
Protest-related deaths